Casa Grande Ruins National Monument ( or Sivan Vahki), in Coolidge, Arizona, just north-east of the city of Casa Grande, preserves a group of Hohokam structures dating to the Classic Period.

History of the area
The national monument consists of the ruins of multiple structures surrounded by a compound wall constructed by the ancient people of the Hohokam period, who farmed the Gila Valley in the early 13th century.

"Casa Grande" is Spanish for "big house" (Siwañ Wa'a Ki: in O'odham); these names refer to the largest structure on the site, which is what remains of a four-story structure that may have been abandoned by 1450. The structure is made of caliche, and has managed to survive the extreme weather conditions for about seven centuries. The large house consists of outer rooms surrounding an inner structure. The outer rooms are all three stories high, while the inner structure is four stories high. The structures were constructed using traditional adobe processes. The wet adobe is thicker at the base and adds significant strength. Noticeable horizontal cracks define the breaks between courses on the thick outer walls. The process consisted of using damp adobe to form the walls and then waiting for it to dry, and then building it up with more adobe. Casa Grande contained a ball court much like that found at Pueblo Grande de Nevada. Father Eusebio Kino was the first European to view the Hohokam complex in November 1694 and named it Casa Grande. Graffiti from 19th-century passers-by is scratched into its walls; though this is now illegal.  Casa Grande now has a distinctive modern roof covering built in 1932.

Administrative history
In 1891, the monument underwent repairs supervised by Cosmos Mindeleff of the Bureau of American Ethnology, until funds ran out. Proclaimed Casa Grande Reservation on June 22, 1892 by Executive Order 28-A of President Benjamin Harrison, 480 acres around the ruins became the first prehistoric and cultural reserve in the United States. It was then re-designated a national monument by President Woodrow Wilson on August 3, 1918.  As with all historical areas administered by the National Park Service, Casa Grande was listed on the National Register of Historic Places on October 15, 1966.

Historic adobes
Between 1937 and 1940 the Civilian Conservation Corps built several adobe buildings to serve as housing and administrative offices for the national monument.  The adobe buildings, constructed using traditional methods, continue in use today and are now listed on the National Register of Historic Places.  Because of careful conservation, the physical appearance of Casa Grande Ruins has hardly changed since the 1940s.

Olmsted shelter
In 1932, a ramada to shelter the ruins from weathering was built by Boston architect Frederick Law Olmsted, Jr. In the early 21st century, a pair of great horned owls took up residence in the rafters of the Olmsted shelter.

The current protective structure covering the "Great House" replaced a wooden similar structure built to protect it in 1903. Due to the fragile nature of the "Great House," visitors to the site are not permitted inside. To protect its integrity, observation by visitors is only permitted outside the structure.

Gallery

See also
 Hohokam Pima National Monument
 List of national monuments of the United States
 List of the oldest buildings in Arizona
 Mesa Grande
 Oasisamerica cultures
 Pueblo Grande Ruin and Irrigation Sites

References
Notes

Bibliography

External links

  National Park Service: official Casa Grande Ruins National Monument website
 
 
 
 

Buildings and structures completed in the 13th century
National Park Service National Monuments in Arizona
Hohokam
Archaeological sites in Arizona
Archaeological museums in Arizona
Museums in Pinal County, Arizona
Native American museums in Arizona
Native American history of Arizona
Archaeological sites on the National Register of Historic Places in Arizona
Civilian Conservation Corps in Arizona
1918 establishments in Arizona
Protected areas of Pinal County, Arizona
Ruins in the United States
13th century in North America
Pueblo great houses
Casa Grande, Arizona
Historic American Buildings Survey in Arizona
Works Progress Administration in Arizona
National Register of Historic Places in Pinal County, Arizona
Ancient Puebloan archaeological sites in Arizona